The 2011–12 Umaglesi Liga was the 23rd season of top-tier football in Georgia. It began on 6 August 2011 and ended on 21 May 2012. The league added two teams for this season, increasing its size from ten to twelve teams.

The league was won by Zestafoni, who successfully defended their title. Metalurgi Rustavi, Torpedo Kutaisi and Dila Gori qualified for the 2012–13 UEFA Europa League, while Spartaki Tskhinvali and Gagra were relegated.

Changes from 2010–11 season
The league expanded from ten to twelve teams for this season. In order to accommodate the additional teams, the competition mode was changed from a single-phase, quadruple round-robin schedule to a double-phase championship.

All twelve teams first played a regular double round-robin schedule for a total of 22 matches, once at home and once away against each opponent. The best eight teams were then admitted to a championship round, while the remaining four teams were to compete with the best two teams of each of the two 2011–12 Pirveli Liga divisions for a total of four free spots in the 2012–13 season.

Teams
Due to the expansion from ten to twelve teams, no teams were directly relegated at the end of the 2010–11 season. However, the ninth- and tenth-placed teams, Spartaki Tskhinvali and FC Samtredia, had to participate in single-match relegation/promotion play-off matches against third- and fourth-placed 2010–11 Pirveli Liga sides Dila Gori and Chikhura Sachkhere. In these matches, Spartaki Tskhinvali retained their Umaglesi Liga berth by beating Chikhura 2–1, while Samtredia were relegated after a 2–0 loss against Dila Gori. Samtredia hence completed a two-year tenure in the league; Dila Gori returned after a three-season absence.

The directly promoted teams from the 2010–11 Pirveli Liga were champions Gagra and runners-up Merani Martvili. Gagra returned to the top Georgian football league after only one season at the second tier, while Merani Martvili made their debut at the highest level of the league pyramid.

In other changes, Olimpi Rustavi were renamed Metalurgi Rustavi prior to this season.

Stadiums and locations
Spartaki Tskhinvali and Gagra play their home matches in Tbilisi due to various inner-Georgian conflicts.

FC WIT Georgia moved from Tbilisi to the newly constructed Mtskheta Park in Mtskheta.

First phase
The league began with a regular double-round robin schedule on 6 August 2011 and concluded this phase on 8 March 2012. The best eight teams qualified for the championship round, which will determine the Georgian champions and the participants for the 2012–13 European competitions. The remaining four teams qualified for the promotion/relegation round, where they will have to compete with the best two teams of each of the two 2011–12 Pirveli Liga divisions for four free places in the 2012–13 competition.

League table

Results

Second phase
This phase began on 12 March 2012 and will end on 21 May 2012.

Championship round
Zestafoni, Dinamo Tbilisi, Torpedo Kutaisi, Metalurgi Rustavi, Merani Martvili, Baia Zugdidi, Dila Gori and Kolkheti Poti ended the first phase in the top eight positions of the table and thus entered the championship round.

The results of the matches among these teams will be used as a base ranking. Each team will then play another double round-robin schedule against every other team.

Table

Results

Promotion/relegation round
WIT Georgia, Spartaki Tskhinvali, Gagra and Sioni Bolnisi finished ninth through twelfth and thus entered the promotion/relegation round, where they will meet the best two teams from each of the two 2011–12 Pirveli Liga divisions. These four teams are Dinamo Batumi, Mertskhali Ozurgeti, Chikhura Sachkhere and Guria Lanchkhuti.

Each team will play another double round-robin schedule against every other team. The best four teams of this round will qualify for the 2012–13 Umaglesi Liga, with the remaining teams beginning the 2012–13 season in the Pirveli Liga.

Table

Results

Top goalscorers

See also
 2011–12 Pirveli Liga
 2011–12 Georgian Cup

References

External links
 Georgian Football Federation 

Erovnuli Liga seasons
1
Georgia